Federico Degli Esposti (born 2 June 1980 in Bologna) is an Italian pairs figure skater and roller skater. With partner Marika Zanforlin, he is the 2003-2006 World Roller Skating Pair Champion. They started competing together in roller skating in 1996 and switched to figure skating in June 2007. They are the 2008 & 2009 Italian silver medalists.

Figure skating competitive highlights
(with Zanforlin)

References

External links
 Official site

Italian male pair skaters
1980 births
Living people
Sportspeople from Bologna
Italian roller skaters